The North Shore Beach and Yacht Club is an Albert Frey-designed building in North Shore, California. It opened in 1959 as part of a $2 million development along the northeastern shore of the Salton Sea which would become California's largest marina.  The property was listed on the National Register of Historic Places in 2015. Ever-increasing salinity from agricultural runoff from both the Coachella Valley and Imperial County combined with fluctuating water levels culminated in a major flood in 1981, destroying the club's jetty and making it impossible for boats to dock at the club; it would be completely closed by 1984. However the club remained in use by the community into the early 1990s.

Like the majority of the buildings which surround it, the North Shore Beach and Yacht Club was abandoned and vandalized. In July 2009, Riverside County supervisors approved the reception of a grant of $3.35 million as part of an overall package of $30 million to redevelop and restore the property.

Salton Sea History Museum

On May 1, 2010, the restored yacht club was reopened to the public as the Salton Sea History Museum, serving as a community center as well as a museum. The property that was the North Shore Beach and Yacht Club is owned by Riverside County, which made the decision to relocate the museum to Mecca, California and the property is now reserved for community events.

In popular culture
Several prominent figures from the entertainment industry docked boats there, among them members of The Beach Boys, Guy Lombardo, Jerry Lewis and The Marx Brothers. North Shore Beach and Yacht Club is pictured on the Album cover of Minutes to Midnight by Linkin Park.

References

Further reading

External links

 Salton Sea History Museum– official site
 The Salton Sea: California's Overlooked Treasure at sci.sdsu.edu
 Aerial view at Wikimapia.org
 Photographs of the yacht club in its abandoned condition and surrounding area at Richardheeps.co.uk

Historical society museums in California
Modernist architecture in California
Sports venues completed in 1962
1962 establishments in California
1984 disestablishments
2010 establishments in California
Museums in Riverside County, California
Coachella Valley
Maritime museums in California
History museums in California
Clubhouses in California
Salton Sea
Sports venues on the National Register of Historic Places in California
Albert Frey buildings
National Register of Historic Places in Riverside County, California